The Synagogue de Nazareth is situated on the Rue Notre-Dame-de-Nazareth, in the 3rd arrondissement of Paris, and is the oldest of the 'great' synagogues of Paris. It is normally known as Synagogue Nazareth rather than Synagogue de la rue Nazareth, its official name.

History
In 1810, the Ashkenazi Jews of Paris, had two synagogues, one on rue Sainte-Avoye (today: rue du Temple) and another on rue du Chaulme (today: rue des Archives). Expelled from the synagogue on Saint-Avoye by the landlord in 1818, the community bought a plot of land in 1819 situated between 14 rue Neuve-Saint-Laurent (today: rue du Vertbois) and 15 rue Notre-Dame-de-Nazareth. After having received permission from the King, Louis XVIII through the ordinance of 29 June 1819, the Assembly of the Jews of Paris, construction began under the direction of architect Sandrié de Jouy, and ended in 1822. The synagogue was built to accommodate a congregation of several hundred worshipers, including galleries for women. The synagogue on rue du Chaume was closed the following year.

Very rapidly faults began to emerge in construction, and in 1848, the building was in danger of collapsing. The police closed it in 1850 and it was destroyed. A new synagogue designed by the architect Thierry (1810–1890) was built on the site funded by donations from Baron James de Rothschild and was inaugurated in 1852.

The synagogue contains an organ, quite common among French Jews since Chief Rabbi Salomon Ulmann published a responsa in its favour. The actress Rachel was a member of the congregation. The composer Jacques Offenbach, after having arrived in Paris, was appointed, with his brother, to train and manage the choir "de la formation et de la direction du chœur" for six months from December 1833. It followed an Alsacien rite, and was the residence of the Chief Rabbis of France and of Paris until the construction of the Grand Synagogue (on rue de la Victoire) in 1875.

The French composer Ernest Cahen played the Cavaillé-Coll organ of the synagogue.

During the Second World War, in 1941 the synagogue was damaged by French collaborators. The chief rabbi of the synagogue, Joseph Saks and his wife were arrested and deported during the Holocaust. Due to the influx of North African Jews from migration, the synagogue changed to follow the Sephardi rite.

Gallery

References

External links
Description from the mayor of 3rd Arrondissement.
Site de la synagogue nazareth

Ashkenazi Jewish culture in Paris
Nazareth
Nazareth
Moorish Revival architecture in France
Synagogues completed in 1852
Buildings and structures in the 3rd arrondissement of Paris
1852 establishments in France
Moorish Revival synagogues